Asgard is a location associated with the gods in Norse cosmology.

Asgard, Asgaard or Åsgård, may also refer to:

Arts and entertainment

Fictional entities
 Asgard (comics), a realm in the fictional Marvel Comics universe, based on the Norse mythology 
 Asgard (Conan) or Aesgaard, a kingdom in Conan the Barbarian universe
 Asgard (Stargate), a race in the Stargate universe
 Asgard, or Ysgard, in the Dungeons & Dragons game
 Asgard, a city in Jack London's The Iron Heel

Music and television
 Asgard (album), by Adorned Brood, 2000
 "Asgard", a song by Therion from the 2001 album Secret of the Runes
 Asgaard (game show), a Mexican TV series

Places
 Asgard Peak, British Columbia, Canada
 Mount Asgard, Baffin Island, Nunavut, Canada
 Asgard Range, Victoria Land, Antarctica
 Aasgard Pass, a mountain pass in Washington, U.S.
 Asgard (crater), on Jupiter's moon Callisto

Ships
 Asgard (yacht), which ran guns for the Irish Volunteers in 1914
 Asgard II, an Irish sail training vessel which sank in 2008

Other uses
 Reidar Åsgård (born 1943), a Norwegian politician
 Asgard Company, a fitness company of Mark Rippetoe
 Asgaard – German Security Group, a German private military company
 Asgard (archaea), a proposed taxonomic group of single-celled organisms
 Asgaard (brewery), a German brewery 
 Asgard field, a natural gas field

See also

 Åsgård (disambiguation)
 Asgardian (disambiguation)
 Asguard (band), a Belarusian band
 Asgardia, a micronation in space
 Åsgardfonna, a glacier in the Arctic
 Åsgårdstrand, a town in Vestfold, Norway
 Åsskard, a village in Surnadal Municipality, Norway
 Åsskard (municipality)
 Hasguard, a hamlet in Pembrokeshire, Wales